Newman Grove is a city in Madison and Platte Counties in the U.S. state of Nebraska. The population was 721 at the 2010 census.

The Madison County portion of Newman Grove is part of the Norfolk, Nebraska Micropolitan Statistical Area.

History
Newman Grove was platted in 1887 when the Fremont, Elkhorn and Missouri Valley Railroad was extended to that point. It was named for a grove of trees nearby planted by Newman Warren.

Geography
Newman Grove is located at  (41.747363, -97.777398).

Education
Newman Grove Public Schools is a K-12 public school district that serves the area.

Religion
There are five churches in town. The United Methodist Church, Trinity Lutheran Church, Shell Creek Lutheran Church, Zion Lutheran Church, and Bible Fellowship Church. There are also numerous country churches surrounding the area.

Demographics

2010 census
As of the census of 2010, there were 721 people, 320 households, and 183 families residing in the city. The racial makeup of the city was 91.1% White, 0.3% Native American, 0.7% Asian, 7.1% from other races, and 0.8% from two or more races. Hispanic or Latino of any race were 10.1% of the population.

There were 320 households, of which 25.3% had children under the age of 18 living with them, 46.6% were married couples living together, 7.8% had a female householder with no husband present, 2.8% had a male householder with no wife present, and 42.8% were non-families. 38.8% of all households were made up of individuals, and 22.8% had someone living alone who was 65 years of age or older. The average household size was 2.15 and the average family size was 2.86.

The median age in the city was 50.1 years. 21.8% of residents were under the age of 18; 3.6% were between the ages of 18 and 24; 16.7% were from 25 to 44; 32.8% were from 45 to 64; and 25.2% were 65 years of age or older. The gender makeup of the city was 46.6% male and 53.4% female.

2000 census
As of the census of 2000, there were 797 people, 323 households, and 190 families residing in the city. The population density was 1,567.9 people per square mile (603.4/km). There were 372 housing units at an average density of 731.8 per square mile (281.6/km). The racial makeup of the city was 90.72% White, 0.25% Native American, 1.00% Asian, 7.53% from other races, and 0.50% from two or more races. Hispanic or Latino of any race were 13.17% of the population.

There were 323 households, out of which 27.9% had children under the age of 18 living with them, 52.3% were married couples living together, 4.0% had a female householder with no husband present, and 40.9% were non-families. 38.4% of all households were made up of individuals, and 24.5% had someone living alone who was 65 years of age or older. The average household size was 2.29 and the average family size was 3.10.

In the city, the population was spread out, with 24.8% under the age of 18, 4.8% from 18 to 24, 22.0% from 25 to 44, 20.6% from 45 to 64, and 27.9% who were 65 years of age or older. The median age was 43 years. For every 100 females, there were 89.8 males. For every 100 females age 18 and over, there were 80.4 males.

As of 2000 the median income for a household in the city was $30,329, and the median income for a family was $39,653. Males had a median income of $26,786 versus $20,000 for females. The per capita income for the city was $16,247. About 3.5% of families and 11.9% of the population were below the poverty line, including 18.5% of those under age 18 and 11.4% of those age 65 or over.

References

External links
 Official page

 

Cities in Madison County, Nebraska
Cities in Platte County, Nebraska
Cities in Nebraska
Norfolk Micropolitan Statistical Area